Patricia G. Parker is a North American evolutionary biologist who uses molecular techniques to assess social structures, particularly in avian populations. Her interests have shaped her research in disease transmission and population size, particularly in regard to bird conservation. She received her B.S. in Zoology in 1975 and her Ph.D. in Behavioral Ecology in 1984, both from the University of North Carolina at Chapel Hill. From 1991 to 2000, Parker was an Assistant and Associate Professor in the Department of Evolution, Ecology, and Organismal Biology at Ohio State University. Since 2000, she is the Des Lee Professor of Zoological Studies at the University of Missouri–St. Louis.

Parker’s current research focuses on disease transmission in birds, their susceptibility and how they achieve protection from such diseases. Her efforts are in the context of conservation of birds in the Galapagos Islands. Parker's lab is now collaborating with the St. Louis Zoo's Wildcare Institute to further this research.

In 2016 she was awarded the Brewster Medal from the American Ornithologist's Union for her work as an author.

Honors

Fellow, Animal Behavior Society, 2003
Fellow, American Association for the Advancement of Science, 2006
Fellow, St. Louis Academy of Science, 2003 & 2006

Bibliography

References

Evolutionary biologists
Women evolutionary biologists
University of North Carolina at Chapel Hill alumni
Ohio State University faculty
Fellows of the American Association for the Advancement of Science
Year of birth missing (living people)
Living people